John Fitzgerald Thierry (September 4, 1971 – November 24, 2017) was a professional American football player who was selected by the Chicago Bears in the 1st round (11th overall pick) of the 1994 NFL Draft. A 6' 4", 263 lb linebacker from Alcorn State University, Thierry was moved to defensive end and played in nine NFL seasons from 1994 to 2002.

He was selected second in the 1999 Cleveland Browns expansion draft, following Jim Pyne. He finished his career with the Atlanta Falcons after recurring shoulder injuries. During his career Thierry played in 131 games and started 70 of them recording 33.5 sacks and 158 tackles with 7 fumble recoveries.

Thierry died on November 24, 2017, of a heart attack at the age of 46.

References 

1971 births
2017 deaths
African-American players of American football
American football defensive ends
Alcorn State Braves football players
Chicago Bears players
Cleveland Browns players
Green Bay Packers players
Atlanta Falcons players
Players of American football from Houston
Ed Block Courage Award recipients